Jalapa is a small town in the Mexican state of Guerrero. It is located near the Pacific Ocean coast, on Federal Highway 200 some 45 km east of San Marcos.

Populated places in Guerrero